Anindita Paul is an Indian singer who sings predominantly in Assamese, Bengali and Hindi languages.

Early life 
Anindita Paul was born in 1979 in Guwahati, Assam, into a Bengali family of Amal Kanti Paul and Shyamali Paul. Her father was in the Contract and Vigilance departments of the Food Corporation of India while her mother was a homemaker who was musically inclined and had performed in college fests.

Early performances 

She acquired a Visharad degree in Indian classical music (vocal) from an institution affiliated to the Bhatkhande Music Institute in Lucknow. She trained with Dwipen Roy in Guwahati and later visited Kolkata to learn from Pandit Ajoy Chakraborty.

Paul began singing at stage shows in Assam. She was soon a graded artist in bhajan and modern song at All India Radio Guwahati. Though her father had been initially hesitant about encouraging her to pursue a musical career, he was soon won over by her dedication to her vocal riyaaz.

Non-film music 

In 2000, Paul issued her first Assamese album  (2000). The lyrics were penned by Assamese poet Shri Kamalananda Bhattacharya (Bawli Kobi) who also crafted the compositions. Paul sang three songs, including the title track, for the album.

In 2001, Paul made her debuted in Bollywood Music Industry where she sang a song "Kaisa Dhuan Uth Raha Hai" along with her Co-Singer Zubeen Garg and Sagarika Mukherjee from Zubeen's album Nupur. 

In 2010, Paul spanned different musical genres with her first solo album, whose title was given by the late Shri Hiren Bhattacharyya.  was an album of mixed genres—primarily modern Assamese song which had a tinge of ballet, R&B and pop-rock while keeping in mind indigenous sensibilities.

Playback singing 

One of the leading female playback singers in Assamese, Anindita has rendered songs for many feature films.
 
After the attention corralled by her song '', Anindita got offers to sing for many Assamese music-directors and this led to her cinematic breakthrough. Renowned Assamese composer Zubeen Garg asked her to sing his composition in the film  (2002) and this marked the start of a creatively rewarding association which continues till date.

Anindita is recognized for her felicity with soft romantic numbers as well as classical songs and has sung in many films for several music-directors.

Prominent milestones include the songs '' from Jetuka Pator Dore (2011) and '' from Munin Barua's acclaimed  (2004). After the latter song, Anindita shifted to Mumbai but continued to be flooded with appreciation from people who adored the song.

Film songs

Non-film songs

Recorded works in Hindi and other languages 

Anindita's singing credentials have been established in a vast range of media platforms.

She sang her first Hindi Song "Kaisa Dhuan Uth Raha Hai" along with her Co-Singer Zubeen Garg and Sagarika Mukherjee from Zubeen's album Nupur in 2001. Later, She also sang under Zubeen Garg's music direction in the Hindi film Strings and the Hindi-Assamese bilingual Ekhon Nedekha Nodir Xhipare. She has crooned for some notable Bengali films, including  under the music direction of the legendary Ravindra Jain. She has also lent her voice to the TV serial Remix (Star One) for music director Pritam.

Anindita can be heard on the remix album Play-Gal Mix (released by Universal Music) and Dance Attack (released by Saregama India Ltd. (HMV)), and has recorded two Telugu devotional songs for renowned flautist Naveen Kumar in Mumbai. Anindita has performed in the prestigious Spirit of Unity Concert for Universal Integration at Visakhapatnam in the year 2007 and recently, she joined Shankar Mahadevan Productions’ musical show My Country My Music.

The emotionally expressive singer has worked alongside the legendary Lata Mangeshkar in the Chhattisgarhi film Bhakla. At the film's recordings, she was fortunate to meet and interact with her senior who also sang a song for the movie.

Anindita is a popular name in the world of advertisement jingles and is the voice behind well-known commercials for Fair & Lovely, Action Flotter, Nerolac Paints, Herbalife, and iBall Andi Hd6. She has also sung for an advertisement for Care Honey Lotion in Pakistan.

Awards 

Paul has been nominated twice for the National Film Awards—for the song '' from the film  and for '' from Jetuka Pator Dore.

2004 Jyotirupa Media Award for Best Female Playback Singer for ''

2005 Prag Cine Award for Best Female Playback Singer for ''

2010 Prag Cine Award for Best Female Playback Singer for ''

2014 Prag Cine Award for Best Female Playback Singer for Raag (film)

2015 Assam State Award Best Female Playback Singer for Raag (film).

References

External links 
 Official Website

Living people
Assamese playback singers
Assamese-language singers
Bengali Hindus
Bengali playback singers
Bengali singers
Bengali-language singers
Bollywood playback singers
Indian pop singers
Indian singer-songwriters
Indian women singer-songwriters
Indian women pop singers
Indian women playback singers
Musicians from Guwahati
Singers from Assam
Singers from West Bengal
Year of birth missing (living people)
21st-century Indian women singers
21st-century Indian singers
Women musicians from Assam